The Bangkok Metropolitan Administration (BMA) is the local government of Bangkok (also called Krung Thep Maha Nakhon in Thai), which includes the capital of the Kingdom of Thailand. The government is composed of two branches: the executive (or the Governor of Bangkok) and the legislative (or Bangkok Metropolitan Council). The administration's roles are to formulate and implement policies to manage Bangkok. Its purview includes transport services, urban planning, waste management, housing, roads and highways, security services, and the environment.

According to the Thailand Future Foundation, Bangkok employs a workforce of 97,000, including 3,200 municipal officers in Bangkok city,  200 in the city Law Enforcement Department, and 3,000 in district offices.

Governor of Bangkok

The Governor of Bangkok ( is the head of the local government of Bangkok. The governor is also the chief executive of the Bangkok Metropolitan Administration (BMA). The governor is elected to a renewable term of four years, currently it is one of the two directly elected executive offices in the kingdom. The office is comparable to that of a city mayor.

From 2016 to 2022 Pol Gen Aswin Kwanmuang acted as Governor of Bangkok. He was appointed by Prime Minister Prayut Chan-o-cha using Section 44 of the interim charter to replace Sukhumbhand Paribatra. The reason given for his ouster was "...because he was involved in many legal cases."

The current incumbent is Chadchart Sittipunt. He was elected in a landslide victory in the 2022 Bangkok gubernatorial election, receiving 52.65 % (1.38 Million) of all votes cast, marking a new record-high, and winning in all 50 districts of Bangkok.

Powers and roles

 Formulate and implement policies for the Bangkok Metropolitan Area.
 Head the Bangkok Metropolitan Administration.
 Appoint and remove deputy governors, advisors, board members, city officials, and public servants.
 Coordinate and carry out the orders of the Cabinet of Thailand, the Prime Minister of Thailand, and the Ministry of Interior.
 Oversee the smooth running of the various agencies and services of the city.
 The governor is also invested with the same powers as any other governor of a province of Thailand and any other mayor.
 The power to draw up legislation and bills for the city, to be considered in the Bangkok Metropolitan Council.

History
Since 1973, the city was administered by a single executive appointed by the cabinet from city civil servants. However soon, it was determined that the executive office should a popularly elected office instead.

The first election for the office was held on the 10 August 1975. Thamnoon Thien-ngern was elected as the first Governor of Bangkok. Conflicts between the governor and the Bangkok Metropolitan Council, however, became so fierce that Thanin Kraivichien, the Prime Minister of Thailand removed him and reinstated the appointment system. Elections resumed with the passing of the Bangkok Metropolitan Administration Act, BE 2528 (1985). Elections were held on 14 November 1985.

List of governors

Unless otherwise indicated, they were elected.

Bangkok Metropolitan Council

The Bangkok Metropolitan Council or BMC ( is the legislative branch of the administration. It is vested with primary legislative powers as well as the power to scrutinize and advise the governor. The council is headed by the Chairman of the Bangkok Metropolitan Council (. The current chairman, since 2013, is Captain Kriangsak Lohachala.

The number of members depends on the size of Bangkok's population. One member represents one hundred thousand people. From 2010 to 2014 there were 61 members, elected from 57 constituencies (some constituencies elect more than one member) in Bangkok. Each is elected to a four-year term. The last election was held on 22 May 2022. Currently there are 50 members, with Pheu Thai making up 20 seats, Move Forward 14 seats, the Democrat Party 9 seats, Rak Krungthep 3 seats, Phalang Pracharat 2 seats and Thai Srang Thai another 2 seats.

Committees
The council is divided into 11 general committees with five to nine members appointed by the councillors themselves:
 Committee of Cleanliness and Environment
 Committee for Checking the Minutes of Sittings and for Considering Closure of the Minutes of the Secret Sittings
 Committee for the Affairs of the Bangkok Metropolitan Council
 Committee for the Public Works and Utilities
 Committee for Education and Culture
 Committee for Health
 Committee for Community Development and Social Welfare
 Committee for Local Administration and Orderliness
 Committee for Economics, Finance, and Follow-up of Budget Utilization
 Committee for Tourism and Sports
 Committee for Traffic, Transportation, and Drainage

Secretariat of the council
The Secretariat of the Bangkok Metropolitan Council ( is the executive agency of the council. The secretariat helps the council in all its roles including drafting of legislation, organisation of sessions, minutes and procedures of the council. The secretariat also helps members of the council by providing research and legal counsel. The secretariat is headed by the Secretary of the Bangkok Metropolitan Council ( The current secretary is Manit Tej-Apichok. The secretariat itself is divided into nine sections:

 General Administration Section
 Council and Committee Meetings Section
 Working Committees Section
 Legislation Section
 Legal Section
 Foreign Affairs Section
 Council Service Section
 Academic Section
 Secretary Section

Departments
BMA has 65 departments in total, 50 of which are departments respective to the 50 districts of Bangkok. The rest consist of: Strategy and Planning Department, Finance Department, Bureau of the Budget, Public Works Department, Drainage and Sewerage Department, Department of Social Development, Department of Environment, Culture, Sports and Tourism Department, Health Department, Bangkok Educational Office, Traffic and Transport Department, Department of Planning and Urban Development, Office of Disaster Prevention and Mitigation and the Medical Services Department.

Department of Law Enforcement 
City Law Enforcement Department is the primary unit for overseeing security and orderliness of Bangkok with more than 3,000 quality personnel. Which has 5 important tasks which are to organize the city,  Security,  Traffic supervision, Tourism Administration and other special missions. Responsible for overseeing, investigating, arresting, prosecuting and enforcing Bangkok Metropolis regulations and other laws within the jurisdiction of Bangkok including operations beyond the authority of the district office or in the case of serious danger to most people.

Department of Disaster Prevention and Mitigation 
The Department of Disaster Prevention and Mitigation operates the city's fire and rescue services. The Bangkok City Council reported in February 2018 that, of Bangkok's 874 fire trucks, only 88 were in "good" condition. Another 340 were rated "only just usable", 232 were "dilapidated", and 225 were parked permanently. Firefighting boats were found to be in roughly the same shape: three of 31 vessels were ranked in "good" condition and 21 were out of service and permanently docked. The BMA's firefighting unit has not been allocated a vehicle maintenance budget for nearly 10 years. The BMA employs 1,800 firefighters .

Department of Medical Services 
The Department of Medical Services operates 11 hospitals and is headquartered at BMA General Hospital (Klang Hospital) in Pom Prap Sattru Phai District. Other hospitals include Taksin Hospital, Charoenkrung Pracharak Hospital, Sirindhorn Hospital, Lat Krabang Hospital, Luang Pho Taweesak Hospital, Wetchakarunrasm Hospital, Ratchaphiphat Hospital, Khlong Sam Wa Hospital, Bang Na Hospital and the Bang Khun Thian Geriatric Hospital. The department also operates the Erawan Medical Centre for emergency medical services.

Department of Planning and Urban Development 
The Department of Planning and Urban Development are divided to Secretarial Office, Town Planning Office, Urban Development and Renewal Office, Geo-Informatics Office, Town Planning Control Division, Policy and Planning Division. The department has a duty to planning of the city including planning for the development of specific areas, planning for conservation Rehabilitation and planning for urban development and also an agency for controlling, promoting and inspecting the use of land and buildings.

Navamindradhiraj University 

BMA autonomously manages Navamindradhiraj University, of which the Faculty of Medicine Vajira Hospital and Kuakarun Faculty of Nursing are part.

Krungthep Thanakom 
Krungthep Thanakom Company Limited is the BMA's holding company for public investment projects such as the concession for the BTS Skytrain and a 20 billion baht underground cable project.

Budget
, BMA's annual budget is nearly 80 billion baht.

Criticism
The Bangkok Post has made the point that, although the city suffers from the "worst traffic congestion in the world after Mexico City", 37 disparate agencies are responsible for traffic management, planning, and infrastructure. It maintains that the city government panders to personal automobile use. As evidence, it points to the city's plans to construct four new bridges across the Chao Phraya River, its runaway air pollution, its lack of green space—less than that of any other Asian capital—and its "...obsession with felling trees along Bangkok streets."

See also
Provinces of Thailand
Districts of Bangkok
History of Bangkok

References

External links
 Bangkok Metropolitan Administration

Metropolitan Administration
 
1973 establishments in Thailand